This is a list of candidates of the 1950 New South Wales state election. The election was held on 17 June 1950.

Retiring Members

Labor
 Bill Dunn (Mudgee)
 Kevin Dwyer (Redfern) — lost preselection
 Bob Gorman (Annandale) — lost preselection for Newtown-Annandale
 Baden Powell (Wollongong-Kembla) — lost preselection

Legislative Assembly
Sitting members are shown in bold text. Successful candidates are highlighted in the relevant colour.

See also
 Members of the New South Wales Legislative Assembly, 1950–1953

References
 

1950